This list of North Carolina A&T Aggies football players in the NFL Draft includes alumni of North Carolina Agricultural & Technical State University that have been drafted into the National Football League (NFL) since the league began holding drafts in 1936. Of the 33 Aggie players listed below, Bob "Stonewall" Jackson was the first player from an HBCU to be drafted by an NFL team. 3 Former A&T players have been selected to a Pro Bowl or league All-Star Game, 3 have won a championship with their respective teams and 1 has been elected to the Pro Football Hall of Fame.

Each NFL franchise seeks to add new players through the annual NFL draft. The draft rules were last updated in 2009. The team with the worst record the previous year picks first, the next-worst team second, and so on. Teams that did not make the playoffs are ordered by their regular-season record with any remaining ties broken by strength of schedule. Playoff participants are sequenced after non-playoff teams, based on their round of elimination (wild card, division, conference, and Super Bowl). Prior to the merger agreements in 1966, the American Football League (AFL) operated in direct competition with the NFL and held a separate draft. This led to a bidding war over top prospects between the two leagues. As part of the merger agreement on June 8, 1966, the two leagues held a multiple-round "common draft". Once the AFL officially merged with the NFL in 1970, the common craft became the NFL draft.

Key

Selections

Footnotes

References 
General

 
 
 

Specific

Lists of National Football League draftees by college football team
North Carolina A&T Aggies NFL Draft